The grey-green scrubwren (Aethomyias arfakianus) is a species of bird in the family Acanthizidae. It is found in the highlands of New Guinea ; its natural habitat is subtropical or tropical montane forests.

This scrubwren was formerly placed in the genus Sericornis, but following the publication of a molecular phylogenetic study of the scrubwrens in 2018, it was moved to the resurrected genus Aethomyias.

References

grey-green scrubwren
grey-green scrubwren
Taxonomy articles created by Polbot
Taxobox binomials not recognized by IUCN